Lenka is a Czech and Slovak feminine given name. Independently, it is also a diminutive of another female name, Lena.

List lenka 
Notable people with the name include:

 Lenka (born 1978), Australian singer-songwriter and actress

B-H
 Lenka Bartáková (born 1991), Czech professional basketball player
 Lenka Bradáčová (born 1973), Czech public prosecutor
 Lenka Cenková (born 1977), Czech tennis player
 Lenka Clayton (born 1977), British-American conceptual artist 
 Lenka Çuko (born 1938), Albanian politician
 Lenka Dlhopolcová (born 1984), Slovak tennis player
 Lenka Dürr (born 1990), German volleyball player
 Lenka Dusilová (born 1975), Czech singer-songwriter
  (1954), Czech singer and musician.
 Lenka Filipová (1993), her daughter and also a singer-songwriter, uses stage name Lenny 
 Lenka Franulic (1908–1961), Chilean journalist
 Lenka Gazdíková, Slovak football goalkeeper
 Lenka Háječková (born 1978), Czech beach volleyball player
 Lenka Harcarikova (born 1991),  Slovak recurve archer
 Lenka Hiklová (born 1980), Slovakian ski mountaineer

I-M
 Lenka Ilavská (born 1972), Slovak road racing cyclist
 Lenka Juríková (born 1990), Slovak tennis player
 Lenka Kebrlová (born 1966), Czech former alpine skier 
 Lenka Kotková (born 1973), Czech astronomer
 Lenka Kulovaná (born 1974), Czech figure skater
 Lenka Kunčíková (born 1995), Czech tennis player
 Lenka Kuncová, Czech paralympic archer
 Lenka Ledvinová (born 1985), Czech hammer thrower
 Lenka Lichtenberg, Canadian singer, composer, songwriter, and animal rights activist 
 Lenka Maňhalová (born 1974), Czech breaststroke and medley swimmer
 Lenka Marušková (born 1985), Czech female sport shooter
 Lenka Masná (born 1985), Czech runner

N-W
 Lenka Němečková (born 1976), Czech tennis player
 Lenka Peterson (born 1925), American actress of stage, film and television
 Lenka Píšová (Born 1982), A Beautiful, sweet kind girl from Chesterfield x
 Lenka Procházková (born 1951), Czech writer
 Lenka Ptáčníková (born 1976), Czech-born Icelandic chess player
 Lenka Radová (born 1979) Czech triathlete
 Lenka Reinerová (1916–2008), Czech author
 Lenka Siroka (born 1997), Czech group rhythmic gymnast
 Lenka Šmídová (born 1975), Czech sailor
 Lenka Tvarošková (born 1982), Slovak tennis player
 Lenka Vlasáková (born 1972), Czech actress
 Lenka Vymazalová (born 1959), Czech field hockey player
 Lenka Wech (born 1976), German rower
 Lenka Wienerová (born 1988), Slovak tennis player

See also
 Lenka (disambiguation)

Feminine given names
Czech feminine given names
Slovak feminine given names